Giorgio Mastropasqua (born 13 July 1951) is an Italian former football player and manager, who played as a sweeper.

Playing career
Mastropasqua was born in Rivoli, Piedmont. Throughout his playing career, which spanned from 1969 to 1988, he played for prestigious teams in the Italian top-flight, such as Juventus, Ternana, Atalanta, Bologna and Lazio.

Coaching career
In the summer of 2011, Mastropasqua was named manager of AlzanoCene in the Italian Serie D, but he resigned after a few months in autumn after a disappointing start to the season

Style of play
Mastropasqua often played as a sweeper, and was known for revolutionising the role in Italy during the 1970s under his Ternana manager Corrado Viciani and the team's dynamic and hard-working possession–based system, which focussed on short passing on the ground. He served as one of the first modern exponents of the position, due to his unique technical characteristics, namely a player who was not only tasked with defending and protecting the back-line, but also advancing out of the defence into midfield and starting attacking plays with their passing after winning back the ball.

Honours
Ternana
Serie B: 1971–72

References

1951 births
Living people
People from Rivoli, Piedmont
Italian footballers
Association football defenders
Serie A players
A.C. Perugia Calcio players
Ternana Calcio players
Juventus F.C. players
Atalanta B.C. players
Bologna F.C. 1909 players
S.S. Lazio players
Catania S.S.D. players
Piacenza Calcio 1919 players
F.C. Pavia players
Footballers from Piedmont
Sportspeople from the Metropolitan City of Turin